Institute for Policy Research may refer to:

Institute for Policy Research and Catholic Studies at The Catholic University of America
Institute for Jewish Policy Research
Institute for Public Policy Research
Institute for Women's Policy Research
Calvert Institute for Policy Research
Kenya Institute for Public Policy Research and Analysis
Manhattan Institute for Policy Research
Northwestern University Institute for Policy Research
San Diego Institute for Policy Research

See also
International Food Policy Research Institute
Stanford Institute for Economic Policy Research